This is a list of all the mountains in Europe with ultra-prominent peaks with topographic prominence greater than . The column "Col" denotes the highest elevation to which one must descend from a peak in order to reach peaks with higher elevations; note that the elevation of any peak is the sum of its prominence and col.

European peaks by prominence

The above European Top 10 list excludes peaks on lands and islands that are part of European countries but are outside or on the limits of the European subcontinent and its tectonic and geographic boundaries, like Teide (with prominence of 3715m), Tenerife Island, Spain; Belukha peak of the Altai Mountains in Russia (with prominence of 3343m); and Piton des Neiges (with prominence of 3069m), Réunion, France.

For ease of reference, the complete list below is divided into sections. Islands in the Atlantic, like Azores and Iceland, the Arctic archipelagos of Jan Mayen, Svalbard, and Novaya Zemlya, Mediterranean Sicily and the other Mediterranean islands, territories of European countries, have also been included as sections (with the exception of Greenland), and are taken into account for the Top 10 List, although being somehow on the European boundaries. Mount Etna active volcano is somehow on, or just outside the boundaries of the Eurasian Plate, resting on the subduction boundary where the African tectonic plate is being pushed under the Eurasian plate, but geographically is part of Europe, and is also included in the Top 10 list.

The sections include peaks on the African Plate, the Canary Islands and Madeira, and some peaks on or just outside the European boundaries located in the Caucasus Mountains (European Russia and the Caucasus states) and the Ural Mountains, both forming the geographic boundaries between the Europe and Asia, but those last mentioned aren't included in the Top 10 List. Mount Narodnaya, the highest peak in the Ural Mountains, is on the main watershed ridge, so on the limits of Europe, and cannot be considered a strictly European mountain and peak. Mount Bazardüzü, also in the Caucasus, has a prominence of 2454 meters, but is located on the limit between Europe and Asia, on the border between Russia and Azerbaijan, so it cannot be considered a strictly European Mountain and peak.

Alps

Apennines, Italian peninsula and neighbouring islands

Arctic islands

Atlantic islands

Balkan Peninsula

Carpathian Mountains

Caucasus Mountains

The boundary between Asia and Europe is following the main ridge of the Caucasus Mountains, also forming most of the border between Georgia and Russia. From the above listed 8 peaks, four (Mount Elbrus, Dykh-Tau, Dyultydag, Gora Addala Shukgelmezr) are entirely in Europe, and four are on the border itself and so are both in Asia and Europe.

Crimea

Greek islands and Peloponnese

Pyrenees & Iberian Peninsula

Massif Central

Scandinavia

Ural Mountains

Peaks over 1500 m elevation that miss the 1500-m cutoff

Highest European ultra-prominent peaks
List of the highest European ultra-prominent peaks (elevation above 2,900 m and prominence above 1,500 m):

See also
Most isolated major summits of Europe
Southernmost glacial mass in Europe

References

External links 

Sourced from peaklist.org;
Continental Europe
European Russia and the Caucasus
Atlantic Islands
Links to numerous trip reports

European Ultras
 Ultra